Terny is an urban-type settlement in Romny Raion of Sumy Oblast in Ukraine. It is located on the banks of the Tern, a tributary of the Sula in the drainage basin of the Dnieper. Terny belongs to Nedryhailiv settlement hromada, one of the hromadas of Ukraine. Population: 

Until 18 July 2020, Terny belonged to Nedryhailiv Raion. The raion was abolished in July 2020 as part of the administrative reform of Ukraine, which reduced the number of raions of Sumy Oblast to five. The area of Nedryhailiv Raion was merged into Romny Raion.

Economy

Transportation
The settlement is connected by road with Sumy, Vorozhba, and Konotop, where it has access to the Highway M02 and further to Kyiv.

References

Urban-type settlements in Romny Raion
Lebedinsky Uyezd